Self-Portrait is a 1623 self-portrait in oils on canvas by Peter Paul Rubens, signed and dated by the artist. He produced it to send to Charles Prince of Wales (the future Charles I) and it is still in the Royal Collection. In 2016 it was included in a exhibition on reuniting Charles I's art collection at the Royal Academy of Arts in London.

Sources
Bruegel to Rubens: Masters of Flemish Painting, London, 2007
Portrait of the Artist, London, 2016
https://www.royalcollection.org.uk/collection/400156/a-self-portrait

1623 paintings
Rubens
Rubens
Rubens
Paintings in the Royal Collection of the United Kingdom
Portraits by Peter Paul Rubens